The Virngrund (also called the Firngrund) is a historical landscape in the counties of Ostalbkreis and Schwäbisch Hall in the German state of Baden-Württemberg. it is forested in many places and up to .

Geography

Location

Historic landscape 
The Virngrund lies between the Württemberg towns of Crailsheim in the north and Ellwangen in the south, as well as south of the Franconian Heights and the Crailsheimer Hart. It extends roughly from Bühlertann and Bühlerzell in the west via the Ellwangen Hills to Wört in the east. Its highest point is the 580.0 m high Hornberg. The River Jagst flows through the Virngrund from south to north and the B 290 federal highway and A 7 motorway cross the landscape; the latter runs through the Hornberg in the Virngrund Tunnel.

References

External links 
 Swabian Jura Club: The Virngrund – Seine Landschaft and seine Geschichte
 Hans-Gerd Michiels and S. Koller: The standörtlichen Grenzen der Buche – das Beispiel Virngrund, AFZ-The Wald 15, 788–790, Online version dated 7 March 2012.
 Anton Steichele: Der Bisthum Augsburg – Der Virngrund
 Gottfried von Franz: Zur Geschichte von Adelmannsfelden (1948; pdf; 316 kB)

Regions of Baden-Württemberg
Forests and woodlands of Baden-Württemberg
Ostalbkreis
Schwäbisch Hall (district)